Hothouse or Hot House or Hot house may refer to:

 A heated greenhouse

Entertainment

Music
 Hot House (composition), a jazz standard written by Tadd Dameron

Albums
 Hot House (Walter Bishop Jr. album), 1979
 Hot House (Gary Burton and Chick Corea album), 2012
 Hot House (Bruce Hornsby album), 1995
 Hot House (Steve Lacy album), 1991
 Hot House (Arturo Sandoval album), 1998

Songs
 Hothouse (78violet song), 2013
 Hothouse (Collette song), 1989
 Hot House (The Sound song), 1982

Fiction, drama, poetry
 Hothouse (audio drama), a 2009 Doctor Who audio play
 Hothouse (novel), a 1962 fantasy/science fiction novel by Brian Aldiss
 The Hothouse, a 1958 play by Harold Pinter
 Hothouses, a book of poetry by Maurice Maeterlinck
 Hothouse (Transformers), a fictional character

Television 
 Hothouse (TV series), a 1988 American television series
 The Hothouse, a 2003 British television series
 The Hothouse, a 2007 New Zealand television series

Other
 Hothouse, Georgia, a community in the United States
 HotHouse (jazz club), a defunct jazz club in Chicago
 Hot House (British band), a British soul band formed in 1987 featuring Heather Small
 Hot House Entertainment, a gay pornography studio
 HotHouse Theatre, an Australian theatre company in Albury-Wodonga

See also
 Hothousing, educational technique
 Hothouse flowers (disambiguation)
 Greenhouse (disambiguation)